San Giulio Island or St. Julius Island is the only island within Lake Orta in Piedmont, northwestern Italy. The most famous building on the island is the Basilica di San Giulio close to which is the monumental old seminary (1840s). Since 1976 it has been transformed into a Benedictine monastery.

Geography 
The little island, just west of the lakeshore village of Orta San Giulio, has very picturesque buildings and takes its name from a local patron saint (Julius of Novara), who lived in the second half of the 4th century. The Church of San Giulio, Castellanza, which is located in Castellanza, Varese, northern Italy, was named after the island.

The island is inhabited permanently by few families and the most historically relevant buildings are the Basilica di San Giulio and the Mater Ecclesiae Abbey. Most of the houses on the island are holiday houses or second houses.

History 
The human presence dates back to the Neolithic and the Iron Age. According to the legend of Julius of Novara's life, during the roman period the island was abandoned.

In the 5th century, a small chapel (oratory) was erected on the island, probably to commemorate the evangelizer Saint Julius, who had died there. From archaeological finds, it is known that a new, larger church already existed in the 6th century: here Filacrio, the bishop of Novara, asked to be buried.

Around the same time, an octagonal building - probably a baptistery - was erected in the middle of the island. Every trace of it disappeared in the 19th century when the massive building of the seminary was built. In the 12th century, a new romanesque basilica was built, thus altering the previous one to some extent.

The religious reformer William of Volpiano (Saint William of Dijon) was born on the island in 962, in the fortified castle located on the island, whose large walls were called "Queen Willa's walls" from the name of king Berengario II's wife.

External links 
Comune di Orta San Giulio 

Islands of Piedmont
Geography of Province of Novara
Lake islands of Italy
Lake Orta
Orta San Giulio